Dakoro  is a department of the Maradi Region in Niger. Its capital lies at the city of Dakoro. As of 2011, the department had a total population of 606,862 people.

References

Departments of Niger
Maradi Region